Penryn East and Mylor is an electoral division of Cornwall in the United Kingdom and returns one member to sit on Cornwall Council. The current Councillor is John Symons, an Independent.

Extent
Penryn East and Mylor covers the centre and west of the town of Penryn, including Penryn College. The division covers 164 hectares in total.

Election results

2017 election

2013 election

2009 election

References

Penryn, Cornwall
Electoral divisions of Cornwall Council